Raymond Edward Smith (born September 18, 1955) is an American professional baseball manager and a former Major League Baseball catcher who appeared in 83 big-league games for the Minnesota Twins from  to .

Smith is the longtime manager of the Twins' Rookie-level farm system affiliate, the Elizabethton Twins of the Appalachian League.  In , Smith will spend his 24th season as manager at Elizabethton and his 32nd year overall with the franchise.

Smith attended the University of Oregon. Signed by Minnesota as an amateur free agent in 1977, he made his pro debut that season with Elizabethton, batting .303 in 63 games and earning a promotion to the Class A Visalia Oaks. He had 47 hits in 215 at bats, including six doubles and one triple. His lone MLB home run, a solo shot, came off Jerry Don Gleaton of the Seattle Mariners on April 15, 1981. He played in the Twins' system through 1984, then spent one season each in the San Diego Padres and Oakland Athletics organizations before retiring as a player in 1986.

In 1987, Smith began his managerial career with the Elizabethton Twins, skippering them for eight consecutive seasons (1987–94).  He then stepped down to a coaching role with Elizabethton for seven seasons, serving from 1995 to 2001.  In 2002, he resumed the helm as the club's manager, and 2017 marks his 16th consecutive year in that role.  In 23 seasons, Smith has compiled a win–loss record of 935–613 (.604), all with Elizabethton.  He has won six league championships.

His teams made the playoffs for eight consecutive seasons (2005–12) and Smith has been named the Appalachian League manager of the year on six occasions.

References

External links
, or Pura Pelota (Venezuelan Winter League)

1955 births
Living people
Baseball players from California
Elizabethton Twins players
Las Vegas Stars (baseball) players
Major League Baseball catchers
Minnesota Twins players
Minor league baseball coaches
Minor league baseball managers
Oregon Ducks baseball players
Orlando Twins players
People from Elizabethton, Tennessee
Tacoma Tigers players
Tiburones de La Guaira players
American expatriate baseball players in Venezuela
Toledo Mud Hens players
University of Oregon alumni
Visalia Oaks players
MiraCosta Spartans baseball players